Frank Joseph McGuigan (December 7, 1924 – April 8, 1998) was an American psychologist. His research spanned multiple areas, including cybernetics, electrophysiology, and psychophysiology.

References

1924 births
1998 deaths
People from Oklahoma City
University of California, Los Angeles alumni
20th-century American psychologists
Pepperdine University faculty
George Washington University faculty
Hollins University faculty
University of Hawaiʻi faculty
North Carolina State University faculty
University of Louisville faculty